The Airbridge Fregat-Hydro is a Russian seaplane ultralight trike, designed and produced by Airbridge of Moscow. The aircraft is supplied as a complete ready-to-fly-aircraft.

Design and development
The Fregat-Hydro was designed to comply with the Fédération Aéronautique Internationale microlight category. It features a cable-braced hang glider-style high-wing, weight-shift controls, a two-seats-in-tandem open cockpit, twin inflatable floats and a single engine in pusher configuration.

The Fregat-Hydro is made from bolted-together aluminum tubing, with its double surface wing covered in Dacron sailcloth. Its  span wing is supported by a single tube-type kingpost and uses an "A" frame weight-shift control bar. On the more recent models the powerplant is a modified liquid-cooled, four-stroke,  Suzuki automotive engine.

Specifications (Fregat-Hydro)

References

External links

2000s Russian sport aircraft
2000s Russian ultralight aircraft
Single-engined pusher aircraft
Ultralight trikes
Airbridge aircraft